Reuven Abergel (born December 26, 1943) is a Moroccan-Israeli social and political activist and a co-founder and former leader of the Israeli Black Panthers.

Biography
Reuven Abergel was born in 1943 in Rabat, Morocco, the fourth of eight children. He immigrated to Israel with his parents and seven siblings in 1950. The family was sent to the immigrant tent camp in Pardes Hana. Later they moved to the seamline Jerusalem neighborhood of Musrara, a former Palestinian neighborhood whose residents were forced to abandon their homes following the 1948 War.

Political activism
In response to the Wadi Salib riots in Haifa, Abergel began to distribute leaflets around his neighborhood. He co-founded the Israeli Black Panthers following the arrest of his friends. He became a leader of the movement and his home became its  headquarters. He was present at the group's  meeting with then-Prime Minister Golda Meir. Since then Abergel has been active in the struggle for social justice and peace in Israel/Palestine as a member of various groups and movements. He currently serves on the board of the Mizrahi Democratic Rainbow Coalition and was  elected to the leadership of Tarabut ("connection"), a joint Jewish-Palestinian political party for peace and equality in Israel.

References

External links
 Interview with Reuven Abergel in Arabic with English subtitles.
 

Anti-Zionist Jews
Moroccan emigrants to Israel
20th-century Moroccan Jews
Israeli people of Moroccan-Jewish descent
Living people
1943 births
People from Rabat